Francesco Scuderi may refer to:
 Francesco Scuderi (athlete)
 Francesco Scuderi (wrestler)